I-44 was an Imperial Japanese Navy Type B2 submarine. Completed and commissioned in January 1944, she served in the late stages of World War II, she conducted war patrols in the Pacific Ocean as a conventional submarine before she was converted into a kaiten suicide attack torpedo carrier. She then conducted kaiten operations during the Battle of Iwo Jima and the Battle of Okinawa before she was sunk in April 1945.

Construction and commissioning

I-44 was laid down on 11 June 1942 by the Yokosuka Naval Arsenal at Yokosuka, Japan, with the name Submarine No. 374. Eventually named , she was launched on 5 March 1943. She was completed and commissioned on 31 January 1944.

Service history

Upon commissioning, I-44 was assigned to Submarine Squadron 11 in the 6th Fleet. Once her workups were complete, she called at the Tokuyama Fuel Depot from 28 to 29 March 1944 to refuel.

First war patrol

She got underway from Agenosho Bay that day, but received a recall order on 5 April 1944. She arrived at Kure on 14 April 1944. After her arrival at Kure, I-44 became the first Japanese submarine fitted with the Type 13 air-search radar.

Operation Tatsumaki

I-44 was reassigned to Submarine Division 15 in Submarine Squadron 1 in the Advance Unit in the 6th Fleet on 28 April 1944. After the submarines launched the Ka-Tsu vehicles, the operation called for the vehicles to proceed to shore, move overland across the atoll's islands, then enter the water in the lagoon and attack Allied ships with torpedoes. Operation Tatsumaki later was postponed pending the correction of defects found in the Ka-Tsu vehicles and eventually was canceled entirely.

Second war patrol

On 15 May 1944, I-44 departed Kure along with I-41 and I-53 to begin her second war patrol. The three submarines were assigned to picket duty off the Bismarck Archipelago, northeast of New Ireland and north of Kavieng. One source has suggested that the U.S. submarine  torpedoed and damaged I-44 on 26 May 1944, but Japanese sources do not confirm this. She crash-dived, but several patrol vessels then attacked her, scoring several more near-misses. She rigged for silent running, and eventually broke contact with them. With her periscopes, her main switchboard, and many of her instruments damaged and a leak in her bow section, she surfaced after escaping the Allied vessels. She soon sighted a U.S. Navy PB4Y-2 Privateer patrol bomber flying nearby; unable to submerge again, she evaded the plane by escaping into a rain squall. She reached Kure on 5 June 1944 and underwent repairs there.

Third war patrol

The commander-in-chief of the Combined Fleet, Admiral Soemu Toyoda, activated Operation Shō-Gō 1 for the defense of the Philippine Islands on 13 October 1944. She was in the Bashi Channel in darkness on 20 October 1944 when an explosion in her automatic trim system pressure tank killed three members of her crew, wrecked her gyrocompass, and disabled one of her propeller shafts. Forced to return to Japan for repairs, she arrived at Kure on 22 October 1944.

Conversion to kaiten carrier

The last surviving Type B2 submarine, I-44 was selected for conversion to carry kaiten suicide attack torpedoes. While she was under repair, her  deck gun was removed to make room on her afterdeck for fittings to allow her to carry four kaitens abaft her conning tower and her aircraft hangar and catapult were removed from her foredeck to make room forward of her conning tower for the fittings for two more kaitens. In addition, a Type 22 surface-search radar also was installed aboard her.

The Japanese originally intended to assign I-44 to take part in the first operational use of kaitens, but cancelled  her participation in the mission in early November 1944.

First kaiten mission

On 19 February 1945, the Battle of Iwo Jima began with the U.S. landings on Iwo Jima. That day, I-44, I-368, and I-370 were assigned to the Chihaya Kaiten Group, with orders to attack Allied ships off the island. I-44 was the last of the three submarines to get underway, departing Otsujima at 09:00 on 22 February 1945 for her fourth war patrol and first kaiten mission. She remained submerged for 47 hours, during which the carbon dioxide levels inside her reached 6 percent, before she could break contact and surface safely.

I-44 reached her patrol area south of Iwo Jima late on 26 February 1945. On 28 February, she attempted an approach to Iwo Jima on the surface from east of the island, but a TBF Avenger aircraft attacked her and forced her to submerge and retire. Later that day, her commanding officer reported the incident and I-44′s withdrawal, but his message did not reach the commander-in-chief of the 6th Fleet, Vice Admiral Shigeyoshi Miwa. On 1 March 1945, she reported her commanding officer's intention to move to the Okidaitōjima area in the Daitō Islands southeast of Okinawa,  but after 6th Fleet headquarters asked her on 2 March 1945 to report her location and any success she had had against Allied ships, her reply on 3 March 1945 was a routine situation report which failed to provide the details the 6th Fleet had requested.

On 6 March 1945, the 6th Fleet cancelled all submarine operations in the Iwo Jima area, and I-44 headed for Japan. She disembarked her kaitens and their pilots at Otsujima on 9 March and on 11 March she arrived at Kure, where Miwa relieved her commanding officer of command.

Second kaiten mission

Between 26 and 29 March 1945, U.S. forces landed in the Kerama Islands southwest of Okinawa and captured advance bases in preparation for an invasion of Okinawa itself. On 1 April 1945, the Battle of Okinawa began with U.S. landings on the island, and on 3 April I-44 received orders to get underway for Okinawan waters as part of the Tatara Group. She departed Otsujima on 4 April 1945 for her fifth war patrol and second kaiten mission, carrying the same four kaiten pilots as she had on the Chihaya Group deployment. On 21 April 1945, 6th Fleet headquarters ordered her to return to Japan, but she did not reply.

Loss

I-44 was lost sometime in April 1945, and the circumstances of her loss remain unknown. Some Japanese historians have concluded that a hunter-killer group made up of the light aircraft carrier  and several destroyers sank I-44 on 18 April 1945, but it is more likely that the submarine sunk in the action was I-56.

As the submarine crash-dived, the plane dropped a depth charge that exploded adjacent to the submarine's conning tower. The submarine probably was I-44.

On 2 May 1945, the Imperial Japanese Navy declared I-44 to be presumed lost in the Okinawa area with the loss of all 134 men aboard — 130 crewmen and four embarked kaiten pilots. She was stricken from the Navy list on 10 June 1945.

Notes

Sources
 Hackett, Bob & Kingsepp, Sander.  IJN Submarine I-44: Tabular Record of Movement.  Retrieved on September 16, 2020.

Type B2 submarines
Ships built by Yokosuka Naval Arsenal
1943 ships
World War II submarines of Japan
Maritime incidents in April 1945
Ships lost with all hands
World War II shipwrecks in the Pacific Ocean
Submarines sunk by aircraft
Japanese submarines lost during World War II